Nobel is a village on the shores of Parry Sound, Ontario, Canada. It is in the Municipality of McDougall in the District of Parry Sound.  The community is named after Alfred Nobel, the inventor of dynamite.

This village is the administrative office of the Shawanaga First Nation reserve.

History
During the First World War, Nobel was the home of two explosives factories: The British Cordite Limited and Canadian Explosives Ltd.  Both sites closed in 1922. Explosives and munitions were also produced at Nobel in World War II.

Nobel is of historical interest to Canadians because it was home of the Orenda Engines testing facility, where the Orenda Iroquois turbojet engine was being developed. This engine was slated to power the ill-fated Avro Arrow until the project was cancelled by the Diefenbaker government.

The British Cordite Ltd, Nobel, Ontario
The British Cordite Limited was built by the Explosives Department of the Imperial Munitions Board to produce Cordite. Construction started in late 1916 and production started in mid 1917. The site covered  and had 155 buildings. By 30 November 1918 it had produced 21,450,000 lbs (9,738,300 kg) of Cordite.

Canadian Explosives Ltd
Canadian Explosives, jointly owned by du Pont, in the USA, and Nobel's Explosives, in Scotland, were already producing Cordite, at Beloeil, for the Quebec Arsenal, before World War I. The capacity of this plant was increased one-hundredfold to 350,000 lbs (159,000 kg) of Cordite per month. In addition, in February 1918, they started to build a Cordite plant at Nobel to produce 1,500,000 lbs (681,000 kg) per month. It was finished on 24 August 1918.

Highway 400 realignment
In 2010, a stretch of the new Highway 400 alignment opened up which now bypasses Nobel. Some businesses in the town were  affected by the new highway due to a sharp decline in traffic and customers, and had to close down. The former route of Highway 69 through the town was renamed as Nobel Road and reduced in width from four to two lanes, with the decommissioned lanes converted into a recreational trail.

A new access road for nearby access to Exit 236 of Highway 400 was built, and named Avro Arrow Road.

References

Notes

Sources
 Carnegie, David (1925). The History of Munitions Supply in Canada 1914 - 1918. London, New York, Ontario: Longmans, Green and Co.
 lank, H. H. and Williams, E. L. (1982). The Du Pont Canada History. Du Pont Canada.
 Reader, W.J. (1970). Imperial Chemical Industries: A History. Volume 1: The Forerunners 1870-1926. London, New York, Toronto: Oxford University Press. .

External links
 Ontario Abandoned Places - Nobel
 Nobel's Local History

Cordite
Communities in Parry Sound District
Military history of Canada